Konec milování is a 1913 Austro-Hungarian drama film directed by Otakar Stáfl and Max Urban.

Cast
 Anna Sedlácková as Irena
 Milos Vávra as Fred
 Jarmila Kronbauerová as Lolotta
 Alois Sedlácek as Family Friend
 Otakar Stáfl as Notary
 Ema Kronbauerová as Irena's Friend
 Ruzena Havelská as Older Irena's Friend
 Václav Nykysa as Chauffeur

References

External links
 

1913 drama films
1913 films
Austro-Hungarian films
Austrian black-and-white films
Hungarian black-and-white films
Czech drama films
Austrian silent films
Hungarian silent films
Austrian drama films
Hungarian drama films
Silent drama films